Blown Apart may refer to:

"Blown Apart", a song by Thinking Plague
"Blown Apart", a song by Bass Outlaws
Blown Apart, an alternate title for the 2008 film Incendiary
"Blown Apart", an episode of Walker, Texas Ranger